Idoch Castle was a 14th-century castle about  east of Turriff, Aberdeenshire Scotland, near Idoch Water, a tributary of the River Deveron.

The alternative name is ‘’’Little Idoch’’’.

History
Idoch Castle is supposed to have been built during the 14th century. The last vestige of the foundations was removed in 1850, when a large quantity of human bones and ashes were discovered.

Structure

There is  no record of the castle's structure.

References

Castles in Aberdeenshire
Former castles in Scotland